Stranded is a 2005 Australian short film directed by Stuart McDonald and starring Emma Lung and Emily Browning. It won the Film Critics Circle of Australia Award for Best Australian Short Film in 2006.

Cast 
 Emma Lung - Claudia
 Emily Browning - Penny
 Robert Morgan - Rex
 David Hoflin - Cam
 Nicki Wendt - Linda
 Ross Thompson - Earnest Vinnie
 Damien Richardson - Eager Vinnie
 Kodi Smit-McPhee - Teddy

References

External links 

2005 short films
2005 films
Australian comedy short films
2000s English-language films
2000s Australian films
Australian black comedy films